Bill Gay (November 12, 1927 – August 8, 2008) was a professional American football player who played defensive back for one season for the  Chicago Cardinals.

References

1927 births
American football cornerbacks
Notre Dame Fighting Irish football players
Chicago Cardinals players
2008 deaths